Metacercops hexactis is a moth of the family Gracillariidae. It is known from Ethiopia.

References

Endemic fauna of Ethiopia
Acrocercopinae
Insects of Ethiopia
Moths of Africa
Moths described in 1932